Janet Sobel (May 31, 1893 – November 11, 1968), born Jennie Olechovsky (occ. Lechovsky), was a Ukrainian-born American Abstract Expressionist painter whose career started mid-life, at age forty-five in 1938. Sobel pioneered the drip painting technique that directly influenced Jackson Pollock. She was credited as exhibiting the first instance of all-over painting seen by Clement Greenberg, a notable art critic.

Early life
Janet Sobel was born as Jennie Olechovsky in 1893 in Katerynoslav, Russian Empire (now Dnipro, Ukraine). Her father, Baruch Olechovsky, was killed in a Russian pogrom. Sobel along with her mother, Fannie Kinchuk, a midwife, and siblings moved to Ellis Island in New York City in 1908. At sixteen years of age, she married Max Sobel, with whom she had five children.

She was the mother of five children when she began painting in 1937. She produced both non-objective abstractions and figurative artwork. Upon recognizing Sobel's talent, her son helped her artistic development and shared her work with émigré surrealists, Max Ernst, André Breton, as well as John Dewey and Sidney Janis.

Career

Effect of inspiration
Her belief in the ethics of self-realization in a democracy led to Sobel's encounter with philosopher John Dewey. Dewey championed Sobel by writing about her in a catalogue statement at the Puma Gallery in New York in 1944. In this catalogue he states:

Her work is extraordinarily free from inventiveness and from self-consciousness and pretense. One can believe that to an unusual degree her forms and colors well up from a subconsciousness that is richly stored with sensitive impressions received directly from contact with nature, impressions which have been reorganized in figures in which color and form are happily wed.

Sobel used music for inspiration and stimulation of her feelings into her canvas. Sobel's works exemplify the tendency to fill up every empty space, sometimes interpreted as horror vacui. She often depicted her feelings through past experiences. Her depiction of soldiers with cannons and imperial armies, as well as traditional Jewish families, reflected the experiences of her childhood. Her figures often demonstrated the time of the Holocaust, where she relived the trauma of her youth. Overcoming those youthful traumas, Sobel found a safe realm for her imagination through art.

Effect of art critics
An art authority during Sobel's time, Clement Greenberg, wrote on avant-garde painting. Although he had not addressed her during the three years her professional works circulated in New York galleries, he eventually positioned "Sobel as a forerunner of Abstract Expressionism". Generally, he only framed Sobel's work relative to Abstract Expressionism or to Pollock, and especially in relation to Pollock's career. He consistently described Sobel's work as inferior to that of Pollock by characterizing it as "'primitive'" and that of a "'housewife'". In certain circles, the effect of his influence was a failure of recognition of her work during her career.

Nonetheless, Peggy Guggenheim included Sobel's work in her The Art of This Century Gallery in 1946, and the influence of her work has been recognized by the artists who were touted highly in critiques by Greenberg.

Sobel also presented a solo show at The Art of This Century Gallery, the brochure for the show was written by Sidney Janis.

As described, some of her work is related to the so-called "drip paintings" of Jackson Pollock, who "'admitted that these pictures had made an impression on him'". By the time Sobel's work was seen in 1946 by Pollock and Greenberg, Pollock had already produced several works using the pouring technique. In his essay "'American-Type' Painting", first published in 1955, the critic cited Sobel's works as the first instance of all-over painting he had seen, but attributed the style to appropriated female nature rather than to artistic creativity. Greenberg went on to say that her art evolved from recognizable figures to a more abstract style of paint dripping.

Sobel's paintings were characterized as belonging to "the realms of surrealism and primitivism." "Sobel was part folk artist, Surrealist, and Abstract Expressionist, but critics found it easiest to call her a 'primitive'." As Zalman summarizes, her title of "primitive" was "a category that enabled her acceptance by the art world, but restricted her artistic development". Grouping Sobel as a 'primitive' painter was part of a greater movement to try to form a unique American form of art, distinct from European art, while still trying to maintain a hierarchy of 'us and them'. Sobel was grouped as inferior due to being a housewife, while other painters could have been dismissed as being mentally inferior in some way. In a way, Sobel also serves as a representative of this conflict. Due to the attitudes of some of the critics of her day, Sobel became known as a suburban housewife who, working professionally as an artist, inspired the feminist conversation around domestic roles of women.

Notable works
Sobel's initial works show a flair for a primitivist figuration reminiscent of early Chagall and serves to herald early Dubuffet. The abundant floral motifs recall Ukrainian peasant art. In addition, the need to exploit media of all sorts is very evident (including sand). If her drip paintings weren't vivid enough, she would opt to outline them in ink in order to compensate. Aiding in inventing Abstract Expressionism did not conclude her imagistic work. Her main goal was visual intensity, which she attained with impressive regularity.

Milky Way, created in 1945, is currently displayed in the Museum of Modern Art.

Death
Sobel died at her home in Plainfield, New Jersey in 1968. In 2021, The New York Times published a belated obituary for her.

References

Further reading

External links
Grandmother of Drip Painting
Janet Sobel on artnet
Hollis Taggart Galleries
Gary Snyder/Project Space on Janet Sobel
Will the Real Janet Sobel Please Stand Up? (PDF by Libby Seaberg available for download
ART IN REVIEW By Roberta Smith The New York Times — PDF available for download)
Mother of Invention (blog)
Significant Careers of Determined Artists: Janet Sobel; Crystal Bridges Museum of American Art
Images of paintings (Pinterest compilation)
2019 YouTube video about Janet Sobel mentioning drip painting and all-over painting 

1893 births
1968 deaths
20th-century American painters
Abstract expressionist artists
American women painters
Painters from New York (state)
Emigrants from the Russian Empire to the United States
20th-century American women artists
Ukrainian artists